dryrobe is a United Kingdom-based clothing brand, created by Gideon Bright. The brand's first product was released in 2010 as a solution to keep athletes and amateur sportspeople warm who were regularly exposed to the elements. It was originally aimed at surfers, but has since branched out to be used by many sport and extreme sports athletes.

In 2014, the dryrobe started to be used by Team GB athletes, beginning with triathletes Alistair Brownlee and Jonny Brownlee. The popularity of the clothing item spread throughout Team GB and was frequently used by Great Britain's athletes in the 2016 Olympics in Rio de Janeiro. By 2016, the item was used for a variety of sports and sports events.

History
dryrobe was first released in 2010. The product was the idea of Gideon Bright, who had frequently struggled to keep warm while changing into surfing gear in the United Kingdom.

As a young surfer, Bright's mother used to use a towelling robe for changing on the beach. However, he and his mother noticed that when it rained or when it was cold, the robe didn't really serve much of a purpose. His mother then created an additional layer made of a tent-like material. Over a decade later, the prototype his mother created was used as the initial step to create the dryrobe product.

During the initial design phase, Gideon Bright visited Australia to study similar products that were on the market. He witnessed people using a parka-like jacket, which they wore both in and of the water. After studying the product, he began to experiment with designs of his own, focusing on towel lined designs. Each prototype was given to friends and people he knew in the watersports community to receive feedback. Bright finally settled on a design for the robe, which he named dryrobe.

Bright funded the company by selling a property he owned and began to distribute the product in 2013. The business began as a home-based business before dryrobe began to expand. When orders began to be placed, Bright priced the first dryrobe at around the £100 mark. Other towel robes that served a similar purpose were much cheaper that the original dryrobe, but also lacked quality and struggled to keep athletes warm. Despite the high price point, the product was well received by the watersport community.

The product first began increase its sales after showcasing the dryrobe to athletes at triathlon shows. Bright was approached by a Team GB performance director, who bought a handful of the dryrobes on the spot. Shortly after the purchase, Team GB triathletes began to wear the products while they were competing. This included Alistair Brownlee and Jonny Brownlee. The exposure of Team GB's athletes wearing the dryrobe, encouraged deals with other sports teams and events. Between 2014 and early 2016, new deals with U.S. Masters Swimming, Tough Mudder and the International Triathlon Union were all agreed.

By early 2016, the brand had expanded beyond triathletes and was now used by other extreme sports athletes. dryrobe Inc. was launched in the United States, with a warehouse to fulfil growing interest in the product in the USA & Canada. This was down to the high interest and demand from Kayakers, Surfers and Obstacle Course Racers in America and Canada. Bright stated in an interview, "it's solving a problem that is inherent in nearly all outdoor sports activities. Getting out of the wind and rain while changing just makes good sense, and will preserve energy to be used via chosen activity."

The popularity of the product within athlete circles led to it featuring in the 2016 Olympics in Rio, predominantly worn by Team GB.

Design

The design was based on a number of common items of clothing used by Australian surfers and swimmers. The parka-like jacket was worn both in and out of the water. Bright felt that while it was a useful item, it could be improved and commercialised. He created the dryrobe to work both in and out of the water, and gave it a more robust design, and the capability to change clothes while keeping the dryrobe on. It was tested in the watersports community. Its versatile design allows it to be used for different sports, and to keep an athlete warm during downtime or immediately after an event.

Application
The dryrobe is commonly used across a number of sporting disciplines and outdoor activities. In 2016, the dryrobe received coverage in the media for its use in the outdoor obstacle event, Tough Mudder. It began life as an item of sports clothing to be used by surfers.

Since then the product has spun out to be used by numerous sporting teams across a variety of sports. According to their website, the dryrobe is commonly used for swimming, surfing, rowing, caravan & camping, OCR, diving, wakeboarding, triathlons, boating, sailing, rugby, surf life saving, kayaking, windsurfing, kitesurfing, paddle boarding, football, mountain biking, skiing/snowboarding, climbing, cycling, cross-country, cliff diving, ironman competitions, athletics, boxing, canoeing, lacrosse, hockey, equestrian, curling outdoor obstacle events such as Tough Mudder, Spartan and Redbull extreme sports.

References

Clothing companies of the United Kingdom